The Encyclopedia of Recorded Sound is a reference work that, among other things, describes the history of sound recordings, from November 1877 when Edison developed the first model of a cylinder phonograph, and earlier, in 1857, when Léon Scott de Martinville invented the phonautograph. The first edition – Guy Anthony Marco, Phd (born 1927) (editor), and Frank Andrews (1920–2015) (contributing editor) – was published in 1993. The second 2-volume edition, published in 2005, spans one hundred forty-seven years of recorded sound. Frank W. Hoffman, PhD (born 1949), of Sam Houston State University is Editor and Howard William Ferstler (born 1943) of Florida State University is Technical Editor.
 

Comments 
The second edition – 1,289 pages – is, according to reviewer Grove Koger, "substantially revised." As stated in the "Introduction," more than sixty percent of its content is new, and all entries retained from the first edition have been updated. James E. Perone, PhD, of University of Mount Union wrote that the second edition "appears to be the most comprehensive reference on recorded sound, encompassing entries found in The New Grove Dictionary of Music and Musicians, The New Grove Dictionary of American Music, and The New Grove Dictionary of Jazz."

Bibliography

Notes

References

  ; .

  .

  ; ; .
 
 
 
 

  ; ; .

  ; ; .
 

  ; ; .

   (publication);  (article);  (article).

   (publication);  (article);  (article).

  .

   (publication);  (article);  (article);  (article).

   (publication);  (article);  (article).

See also 

  .

British encyclopedias
Encyclopedias of U.S. states
Sound recording
Specialized encyclopedias
Encyclopedias of history
Encyclopedias of music
21st-century encyclopedias
Routledge books
Audio engineering
Sound recording
Sound recording